Sienne may refer to the following:

Places
Canton of Quettreville-sur-Sienne, French canton
Gavray-sur-Sienne, French commune
Heugueville-sur-Sienne, French commune
Noues de Sienne, French commune
Orval-sur-Sienne, French commune
Quettreville-sur-Sienne, French commune
Tourville-sur-Sienne, French commune

People
Aldebrandin de Sienne, alternate name of Aldebrandin of Siena
Catherine de Sienne, alternate name of Catherine of Siena

Others
 Sienne (river), river in France

See also
Siena, an Italian town, and Siena_(disambiguation)
Seine, a river in France, and Seine_(disambiguation)